Chi Upsilon Sigma ("Women of Wisdom") — official name is Corazones Unidos Siempre Chi Upsilon Sigma National Latin Sorority, Inc. (Hearts United Always) — is a Latin-based Greek letter intercollegiate sorority. Chi Upsilon Sigma was founded on April 29, 1980, by seven Latinas at the New Brunswick Campus of Rutgers University in New Brunswick, New Jersey.

The sorority is a member organization of the National Association of Latino Fraternal Organizations (NALFO).

History
The seven founding mothers are: 
Maricel Rivera
Sonia Rosa
Catherine Miranda
Mariela Freay
Nancy Collazo
Maria E. Tejera
Evelyn Burgos

Due to the shifts in the cultural and political arenas, the late 1970s/early 1980s was a thriving time for the Latino community in the Northeastern United States. Activism on college campuses was common ground. Corazones Unidos Siempre/Chi Upsilon Sigma Sorority, Inc. was formed to challenge inequality, poor funding, and inferior quality of life for Latino students. Corazones Unidos Siempre was formed with three goals, to provide service, to encourage communication, and develop awareness amongst the community.

Philanthropy
Chi Upsilon Sigma's national philanthropy is the I Have A Dream Foundation.

Chapters

Undergraduate Chapters
Active chapters of Chi Upsilon Sigma include: 
 Alpha - Rutgers–New Brunswick, New Brunswick, New Jersey
 Beta - Rutgers–Newark, Newark, New Jersey
 Gamma - Seton Hall University, South Orange, New Jersey
 Delta - The College of New Jersey, Ewing Township, New Jersey
 Epsilon - Rutgers–Camden, Camden, New Jersey
 Zeta - Saint Peter's University / New Jersey City University, Jersey City, New Jersey
 Eta - Temple University, Philadelphia, Pennsylvania
 Theta - Kutztown University / Albright College Kutztown, Pennsylvania / Reading, Pennsylvania
 Iota - Bloomsburg University, Bloomsburg, Pennsylvania
 Kappa - Montclair State University, Montclair, New Jersey
 Lambda - Rowan University, Glassboro, New Jersey
 Mu - Philadelphia Metropolitan, Philadelphia, Pennsylvania
 Nu - Kean University, Union County, New Jersey
 Xi - University of Delaware, Newark, Delaware
 Omicron - Drexel University, Philadelphia, Pennsylvania
 Pi - University of North Texas, Denton, Texas
 Rho - Fairleigh Dickinson University, Madison, New Jersey/Florham Park, New Jersey
 Sigma - Long Island University - CW Post, Brookville, New York
 Tau - Central Connecticut State University, New Britain, Connecticut
 Upsilon - LeMoyne College/Syracuse University, Syracuse, New York
 Phi - Texas A&M University, College Station, Texas
 Chi - Pennsylvania State University, University Park
 Psi - University of South Carolina, Columbia, South Carolina
 Omega - Reserved for Honorary Sisters
 Alpha Alpha - West Chester University, West Chester, Pennsylvania
 Alpha Beta - Rider University, Lawrence Township, New Jersey
 Alpha Gamma - Rollins College, Winter Park, Florida
 Alpha Delta -  Cornell University, Ithaca, New York
 Alpha Epsilon - Penn State Abington, Abington Township, Pennsylvania
 Alpha Zeta - Texas Christian University, Fort Worth, Texas
 Alpha Eta - Texas Woman's University, Denton, Texas
 Alpha Theta - Utica College, Utica, New York
 Alpha Iota - University of Rhode Island, Kingston, Rhode Island
 Alpha Kappa - Stevens Institute of Technology, Hoboken, New Jersey
 Alpha Lambda - University of North Carolina, Charlotte, North Carolina
 Alpha Mu - University of South Florida, Tampa, Florida
 Alpha Nu - New York City Metropolitan New York, New York
 Alpha Xi - University of Central Florida, Orlando, Florida
 Alpha Omicron - Washington D.C./North Virginia Metropolitan Washington D.C./North Virginia
 Alpha Pi - State University of New York New Paltz New Paltz, New York
 Alpha Rho - University of Bridgeport, Bridgeport, Connecticut
 Alpha Sigma - Radford University, Radford, Virginia
 Alpha Tau - Texas State University, San Marcos, Texas
 Alpha Upsilon - New Mexico State University, Las Cruces, New Mexico
 Alpha Phi - Boston University, Boston, Massachusetts
 Alpha Chi - University of Arizona, Tucson, Arizona
 Alpha Psi - State University of New York College at Oneonta, Oneonta, New York
 Alpha Omega - Reserved
 Beta Alpha - University of Texas at Austin, Austin, Texas
 Beta Beta - University of North Carolina at Greensboro, Greensboro, North Carolina
 Beta Gamma - Johnson & Wales University (Miami Campus), North Miami, Florida
 Beta Delta - George Mason University, Fairfax, Virginia
 Beta Epsilon - University of Houston, Houston, Texas
 Beta Zeta -  William Paterson University, Wayne, New Jersey
 Beta Eta - University of Michigan at Ann Arbor Ann Arbor, Michigan
 Beta Theta - Shippensburg University and Elizabethtown College, Shippensburg, Pennsylvania/Elizabethtown, Pennsylvania
 Beta Iota - Binghamton University, Binghamton, New York
 Beta Kappa - Fairleigh Dickinson University, Teaneck, New Jersey
 Beta Lambda - Bloomfield College, Bloomfield, New Jersey
 Beta Mu - University of Maryland-College Park, College Park, Maryland
 Beta Nu - Millersville University, Millersville, Pennsylvania
 Beta Xi - State University of New York Albany, Albany, New York
 Beta Omicron - Penn State University, Harrisburg, Pennsylvania
 Beta Pi - East Stroudsburg University, East Stroudsburg, Pennsylvania
 Beta Rho - Quinnipiac University, Hamden, Connecticut
 Beta Sigma - Rochester Institute of Technology, Rochester, New York
 Beta Tau - Ramapo College of New Jersey, Mahwah, New Jersey
 Beta Upsilon - University of Wisconsin- Madison, Madison, Wisconsin 
 Beta Phi - Indiana University of Pennsylvania, Indiana, Pennsylvania
 Beta Chi - Appalachian State University, Boone, North Carolina
 Beta Psi - Elon University, Elon, North Carolina
 Beta Omega - Charlotte City-Wide, Charlotte, North Carolina
 Gamma Alpha - Stockton University, Galloway, New Jersey
 Gamma Beta - Monmouth University, West Long Branch, New Jersey
 Gamma Gamma - University of Massachusetts Dartmouth - North Dartmouth, Massachusetts
 Gamma Delta - University of New Haven, West Haven, Connecticut
 Gamma Epsilon - University of South Carolina Upstate, Spartanburg, South Carolina
 Gamma Zeta - Metropolitan State University of Denver, Denver, CO
 Gamma Eta - York College of Pennsylvania, York, PA

Graduate chapters
Graduate chapters of Chi Upsilon Sigma include: 
Omega Alpha - Philadelphia Graduate Chapter
Omega Beta - Dallas/Fort Worth Graduate Chapter
Omega Gamma - North/Central NJ Graduate Chapter
Omega Delta - New York City Graduate Chapter
Omega Epsilon - Greater Washington, D.C. Metropolitan Area Graduate Chapter
Omega Zeta - Houston Graduate Chapter
Omega Eta - Florida Graduate Chapter
Omega Theta - Lehigh Valley Area, PA Graduate Chapter
Omega Iota - Charlotte Metro Area Graduate Chapter
Omega Kappa - Southern New England Area Graduate Chapter
Omega Lambda - Tampa Graduate Chapter
Omega Mu - South New Jersey Area Graduate Chapter
Omega Nu- California Graduate Chapter
Omega Xi- Central Pennsylvania Graduate Chapter
Omega Omicron- Southern Florida Graduate Chapter
Omega Pi- Midwest Area Graduate Chapter

See also
 List of social fraternities and sororities
 National Association of Latino Fraternal Organizations

References

Student organizations established in 1980
National Association of Latino Fraternal Organizations
Student societies in the United States
Hispanic and Latino American organizations
1980 establishments in New Jersey